Taskwarrior is an open-source, cross platform time and task management tool, used to keep track of and handle tasks. It has a command-line interface rather than a graphical user interface.

Taskwarrior uses concepts and techniques described in Getting Things Done by David Allen, but is paradigm-agnostic in that it does not require users to adhere to any given life-management philosophy.

According to its author, Taskwarrior was created "to address layout and feature issues" in the Todo.txt applications popularized by Gina Trapani.
The authors offer an accompanying tool called Timewarrior for tracking time spent on projects. Configuration allows e. g. to define recurring breaks such as lunch time. The documentation notes that "Timewarrior focuses on accurately recording time already spent, whereas Taskwarrior looks forward to work that is not yet done."

Availability
Taskwarrior's source code is freely available and can be compiled and run on a variety of architectures and operating systems, or installed using binaries obtained with common package management tools: (apt, Fink, yum, dnf, pkgng, pkg_add, etc.)

Typical Workflow
Taskwarrior comprises three main commands: add, list, and done. All other functionality – recurrences, tags, priorities, etc. – are optional.

Adding a task
$ task add Pick up keys to the new apartment
Created task 1.

Listing Tasks
$ task list
ID Project Pri Due Active Age    Description                      
1                        4 secs Pick up keys to the new apartment
1 task

Marking a task as completed
$ task 1 done
Completed 1 'Pick up keys to the new apartment'.
Marked 1 task as done.

Creating a task with due dates, recurrences, and tags
$ task add Mow the lawn project:Lawnwork due:tomorrow recur:biweekly +home
Created task 1.

Syncing
When used in conjunction with Taskserver, can sync tasks into the cloud, and indirectly with other clients/devices.

Accolades
 Issue 124 of the UK Linux Format magazine (November 2009) featured Taskwarrior in its Hot Picks section.
 RadioTux Talk #137 (July 2011, German) chose Taskwarrior as Hot Pick
 FLOSS Weekly dedicated episode 175 (July 2011) to Taskwarrior
 Linux Voice featured a tutorial on Taskwarrior

See also

 Comparison of time-tracking software
 Getting Things Done
 Time management
 Task management
 Org-mode

References

External links
 
GitHub

Administrative software
Time-tracking software
Task management software
Free task management software
Free personal information managers
Cross-platform free software
Free calendaring software
Software using the MIT license
Command-line software